D-glycero-beta-D-manno-heptose 1-phosphate adenylyltransferase (D-beta-D-heptose 7-phosphate kinase/D-beta-D-heptose 1-phosphate adenylyltransferase, D-glycero-D-manno-heptose-1beta-phosphate adenylyltransferase, hldE (gene), rfaE (gene)) is an enzyme with systematic name ATP:D-glycero-beta-D-manno-heptose 1-phosphate adenylyltransferase. This enzyme catalyses the following chemical reaction

 D-glycero-beta-D-manno-heptose 1-phosphate + ATP  ADP-D-glycero-beta-D-manno-heptose + diphosphate

The enzyme is involved in biosynthesis of ADP-L-glycero-beta-D-manno-heptose.

References

External links 
 

EC 2.7.7